The Resurrectionist may refer to:

 The Resurrectionist, a 1979 novel by Gary K. Wolf
 The Resurrectionist, a 2006 novel by James Bradley

It may also refer to:

 The Resurrectionists, a 2000 novel by Kim Wilkins
 Resurrectionist (James McGee novel), a 2007 novel by James McGee
 The Resurrectionist Order of the Roman Catholic Church
 The practice of Body-snatching